This article uses national romanization of Ukrainian.

Anatolii Matios (Anatolii Vasylyovych Matios) was born on February 13, 1969, in the village of Roztoky, Putyla Raion of Chernivtsi Oblast, Bukovina. The Deputy Prosecutor-General of Ukraine since June 27, 2014; the Chief Military Prosecutor of Ukraine (June 27, 2014 - September 2, 2019). Colonel General of Justice PhD in Law.

Awards 
In 2007 - awarded the honorary title of "Meritorious jurist of Ukraine.".

External links 
 Anatolii Matios. Official personal website
 Official personal page on Facebook
 Official personal page on Twitter
 Official personal page on Google+

References 

1969 births
Living people
Ukrainian jurists
Security Service of Ukraine officers
Pro-Ukrainian people of the 2014 pro-Russian unrest in Ukraine
Chernivtsi University alumni